Trupanea femoralis is a species of tephritid or fruit flies in the genus Trupanea of the family Tephritidae.

Distribution
United States & Mexico.

References

Tephritinae
Insects described in 1869
Diptera of North America